Louise Carletti (27 February 1922 – 1 April 2002) was a French film actress. She was married to the director Raoul André.

Selected filmography
 People Who Travel (1938)
 Girls in Distress (1939)
 The White Slave (1939)
 The Black Diamond (1941)
 Annette and the Blonde Woman (1942)
 Patricia (1942)
 The Murderer is Afraid at Night (1942)
 Mademoiselle Béatrice (1943)
 We Are Not Married (1946)
 The Faceless Enemy (1946)
 The Village of Wrath (1947)
 Good Enough to Eat (1951)
 The Babes Make the Law (1954)
 The Babes in the Secret Service (1956)
 Mission to Caracas (1965)

References

Bibliography
 Kennedy-Karpat, Colleen. Rogues, Romance, and Exoticism in French Cinema of the 1930s. Fairleigh Dickinson, 2013.

External links

1922 births
2002 deaths
French film actresses
Actresses from Marseille
20th-century French actresses